Sarabisheh (also Romanized as Sarābīsheh, Sarāb Bījeh, Sarāb Bīsheh, (J)Oseph (C)Ohencheh, and Sarābīcheh) is a village in Dorud Rural District, in the Central District of Dorud County, Lorestan Province, Iran. At the 2006 census, its population was 55, in 9 families.

References 

Towns and villages in Dorud County